Stephanie Laurens (born in Ceylon, now Sri Lanka), is a best-selling Australian author of romance novels.

Biography
Stephanie Laurens was born on 14 August 1953 in Sri Lanka. When she was 5, her family moved to Melbourne, where she was raised. After continuing through school and earning a PhD in Biochemistry in Australia, Laurens and her husband moved to Great Britain, taking one of the last true overland journeys from Kathmandu to London.

Once in London, Laurens and her husband both began work as research scientists in Kent. They lived in an area surrounded by history. Their own cottage was built in the 16th century, while next door were the protected ruins of an early Roman villa, and nearby was a 14th-century castle.

After four years in England, Laurens and her husband returned to Australia, where she continued to work in cancer research, eventually heading her own research laboratory. One evening she realised that she did not have any more of her favourite romance novels to read. After years of thinking about writing her own novel, during nights and weekends for the next several months she began crafting her own story. That manuscript, Tangled Reins, was the first of her books to be published. After achieving a level of success with her novels, Laurens "retired" from scientific research and became a full-time novelist. Her novels are primarily historical romances set in the Regency time period.

Stephanie Laurens and her husband live in Melbourne with their two cats.

Bibliography

Regency Tangled Series (also published as The Regency Collection Volume 1)
 Tangled Reins (1992) *also published in A Season for Scandal (2001)
 Four in Hand (1993) *also published in Regency Revels and Regency Romps (1994)
 Impetuous Innocent (1994) *also published in Regency Revels
 Fair Juno (1994) *also published in A Season for Scandal (2001)

Lester Family Saga Series
 The Reasons for Marriage (Jason, Lenore) (1994) *also published in Rogues' Reform (2000);  A Season for Marriage (2004)
 A Lady of Expectations (Jack, Sophie) (1995) *also published in Rogues' Reform (2000); A Season for Marriage (2004)
 An Unwilling Conquest (Harry, Lucinda) (1996) *also published in Rogues' Reform (2000); A Convenient Marriage (1996); A Suitable Marriage (2004)
 A Comfortable Wife (Philip, Antonia) (1997) *also published in A Convenient Marriage (1996); A Suitable Marriage (2004)

Bastion Club Series
  (prequel) Captain Jack's Woman (Jack, Kit) (1997)
 The Lady Chosen (Tristan, Leonora) (2003)
 A Gentleman's Honor (Tony, Alicia) (2003)
 A Lady of His Own (Charles, Penny) (2004)
 A Fine Passion (Jack, Clarice) (2005)
 To Distraction (Deverell, Phoebe) (2006)
 Beyond Seduction (Gervase, Madeline) (2007)
 The Edge of Desire (Christian, Leticia) (2008)
 Mastered by Love (Royce, Minerva) (July 2009) *finale, traitor revealed

The Cynster Novels (first generation)
 Devil's Bride (Devil, Honoria) (1998)
 A Rake's Vow (Vane, Patience) (1998)
 Scandal's Bride(Scandal, Catriona) (1999)
  A Rogue's Proposal (Demon, Flick)
 A Secret love (Gabriel, Alathea) (1999)
 All About Love (Lucifer, Phyllida) (2001)
 All About Passion (Gyles, Francesca) (2001)
 The Promise in a Kiss (Sebastian, Helena) (2001) *Prequel
 On a Wild Night (Amanda, Martin) (2002)
 On a Wicked Dawn (Amelia, Luc) (2002)
 The Perfect Lover (Simon, Portia) (2003)
 The Ideal Bride (Michael, Caro) (2004)
 The Truth about Love (Gerrard, Jacqueline) (2005)
 What Price Love? (Dillon, Pris) (2006)
 The Taste of Innocence (Charlie, Sarah) (2007)
 Where the Heart Leads (Barnaby, Penelope) (2008)
 Temptation and Surrender (Jonas, Emily) (2009)
The Cynster Sisters Trilogy

 Viscount Breckenridge to the Rescue (Heather, Breckenridge) (2010)
 In Pursuit of Eliza Cynster (Eliza, Jeremy) (2011)
 The Capture of the Earl of Glencrae (Angelica, Glencrae) (2012)

The Cynster Sisters Duo

 And Then She Fell (Henrietta, James) (2013)
 The Taming of Ryder Cavanaugh (Mary, Ryder) (2013)

Cynsters Next GenerationBy Winter's Light (prequel/special) (Claire, Daniel) (2014)
 The Tempting of Thomas Carrick (Lucilla, Thomas) (2015)
 A Match for Marcus Cynster (Marcus, Niniver) (2015)A Conquest Impossible to Resist (Prudence, Deaglan) (2019)
 The Inevitable Fall of Christopher Cynster (Christopher, Ellen) (2020)The Games Lovers Play (Devlin, Therese) (2021)The Secrets of Lord Grayson Child (Gray, Isadora) (2021)

Devil's Brood Trilogy

 The Lady by His Side (Sebastian, Antonia) (2017)
 An Irresistible Alliance (Michael, Cleome) (2017)
 The Greatest Challenge of Them All (Louisa, Drake) (2017)

The Casebook of Barnaby Adair Novels
 The Truth about Love (Gerrard, Jacqueline) (2005) (also listed as Cynster 13) *PrequelWhere The Heart Leads (Penelope, Barnaby) (2008) (also listed as Cynster 16)The Peculiar Case of Lord Finsbury's Diamonds (2014) The Masterful Mr. Montague (Violet, Heathcote) (2014)The Curious Case of Lady Latimer's Shoes (2014)
 Loving Rose: The Redemption of Malcolm Sinclair (Rose, Malcolm) (2014)The Confounding Case of the Carisbrook Emeralds (Hugo, Cara) (2018)The Murder of Mandeville Hall (Alaric, Constance) (2018)Lady Osbaldestone's Christmas Chronicles

 Lady Osbaldestone's Christmas Goose (2017) Lady Osbaldestone and the Missing Christmas Carols (2018) Lady Osbaldestone's Plum Puddings (2019) Lady Osbaldestone's Christmas Intrigue (2020)The Cavanaughs

 The Designs of Lord Randolph Cavanaugh (Randolph, Felicia) (2018)
 The Pursuits of Lord Kit Cavanaugh (Kit, Sylvia) (2019)
 The Beguilement of Lady Eustacia Cavanaugh (Frederick, Stacie) (2019)
 The Obsessions of Lord Godfrey Cavanaugh (Godfrey, Elinor) (2020)

Black Cobra Quartet Series
 The Untamed Bride (Derek, Deliah) (2009)
 The Elusive Bride (Gareth, Emily) (2010)
 The Brazen Bride  (Logan, Linnet) (2010)
 The Reckless Bride  (Rafe, Loretta) (26 October 2010)

Adventurers Quartet (Frobisher Family)
 The Lady's Command (Delan, Edwina) (2015)
 A Buccaneer at Heart (Robert, Aileen) (2016)
 The Daredevil Snared (Caleb, Katherine) (2016)
 Lord of the Privateers (Royd, Isobel) (2016)

Other Novels

 The Lady Risks All (Neville, Miranda) (2012)  *Characters connected to The Edge of Desire; The Reckless Bride; The Lady's Command Desire's Prize (Montisfryn, Eloise) (2013) 
 1750: Jaqueline (Richard, Jaqueline) (2018) *2nd in the Legend of Nimway Hall series

Novellas, Shorts & Anthologies

 Melting Ice (Dyan, Fiona) (1998) *Originally published in Rough Around the Edges (with Dee Holmes, Susan Johnson and Eileen Wilks) and Scandalous Brides (with Celeste Bradley, Christina Dodd and Leslie LaFoy) Regency Collection Volume 5 (1999) (with Paula Marshall)
 The Regency Collection 8 (1999) (with Sylvia Andrew)
 Rose In Bloom (Duncan, Rose) (1999) *Originally published in Scottish Brides (with Christina Dodd, Julia Quinn and Karen Ranney) Scandalous Lord Dere (Adrian, Abigail) (2000) *Originally published in Secrets of a Perfect Night  (with Victoria Alexander and Rachel Gibson)
 Lost and Found (Reggie, Anne) (2005) *Originally published in Hero, Come Back (with Elizabeth Boyle and Christina Dodd) The Fall of Rogue Gerrard (Ro, Lydia) (2008) *Originally published in It Happened One Night The Seduction of Sebastion Trantor (Sebastion, Tabitha) (2011) *Originally published in It Happened One Season (with Mary Balogh; Jacquie D'Alessandro; and Candice Hern) The Wedding Planner (Gaston, Margaret) (2011) *Originally published in Royal Weddings (with Loretta Chase and Gaelen Foley) Return Engagement (Robert, Nell) (2012) *Originally published in Royal Bridesmaids (with Loretta Chase and Gaelen Foley)''

External links
 Stephanie Laurens official website
 Stephanie Laurens in FantasticFiction

Australian romantic fiction writers
Australian women novelists
Women science fiction and fantasy writers
Living people
Sri Lankan emigrants to Australia
Writers from Melbourne
Women romantic fiction writers
RITA Award winners
1953 births